The discography of the German pop music project Sweetbox includes 10 studio albums, one live album, 13 compilation albums, and 29 singles.

Studio albums

Live albums

Compilation albums

Singles

Video collections

Soundtracks

References

Pop music discographies
Discographies of American artists
Discography